Peter Henry Madsen (9 February 1900 – 12 November 1972) was a Danish field hockey player who competed in the 1928 Summer Olympics.

He was born in Helsingør and died in Copenhagen.

In 1928 he was a member of the Danish team which was eliminated in the first round of the Olympic tournament after two wins and two losses.  He played one match as back.

External links
 
 

1900 births
1972 deaths
Danish male field hockey players
Olympic field hockey players of Denmark
Field hockey players at the 1928 Summer Olympics
People from Helsingør
Sportspeople from the Capital Region of Denmark